Daehyeon-dong is a dong, or neighborhood, of Nam-gu in Ulsan, South Korea. 

Originally Yaeum 2-dong, the neighborhood was renamed in 2007.

Education 
The following schools are located in Daehyeon-dong:

Elementary schools 

Daehyun elementary school (대현초학교)
Dosan elementary school (도산초등학교)
Ulsan Nambu elementary school (울산남부초등학교)
Ya-eum elementary school (야음초등학교)
Yeocheon elementary school (여천초등학교)
Yong-yeon elementary school (용연초등학교)

Middle schools 

Taehwa middle school (태화중학교)
Ya-eum middle school (야음중학교)

High schools 

Daehyeon high school (대현고등학교)
Sinseon girls' high school (신선여자고등학교)

References

External links
Ulsan Namgu home page

Nam District, Ulsan
Neighbourhoods in South Korea